Liver or Die is a 2019 South Korean television series starring Yoo Jun-sang, Oh Ji-ho, Jeon Hye-bin, Lee Si-young and Cha Seo-won. It aired from January 9 to March 14, 2019 on KBS2's Wednesdays and Thursdays at 22:00 (KST) time slot.

Synopsis
The story of Lee Poong-sang, a lonely middle-aged man, who has never lived for himself.

Cast

Main
 Yoo Jun-sang as Lee Poong-sang (47 years old)
The eldest brother and father figure of the family.
 Oh Ji-ho as Lee Jin-sang (42 years old)
Choi Seung-hoon as young Jin-sang
He is the second oldest sibling and is seen as the family's "lost cause".
 Jeon Hye-bin as Lee Jeong-sang (35 years old)
She is the older twin and a university hospital doctor.
 Lee Si-young as Lee Hwa-sang (35 years old)
She is the younger twin and is seen as the family's black sheep.
 Cha Seo-won as Lee Wi-sang (29 years old)
He is the youngest sibling. He couldn't realize his dream of becoming a professional baseball player.

Supporting

Other family members
 Shin Dong-mi as Kan Boon-shil (47 years old)
Poong-sang's wife.
 Lee Bo-hee as Noh Yang-shim (65 years old)
Poong-sang, Jin-sang, Jeong-sang, Hwa-sang and Wi-sang's mother.
 Park In-hwan as Kan Bo-koo (70 years old)
Boon-shil's father. He runs the laundry.
 Kim Ji-young as Lee Joong-yi (15 years old)
Poong-sang and Boon-shil's daughter.

Others
 Ki Eun-se as Jo Young-pil (35 years old), Jeong-sang's friend.
 Song Jong-ho as Jin Ji-ham (41 years old), Jeong-sang's senior at the hospital, he's a surgeon.
 Choi Sung-jae as Kang Yeol-han (35 years old), Jeong-sang's colleague and past lover.
 Lee Sang-sook as Jeon Dal-ja (60 years old), Super Woman from Chungcheong Province.
 Choi Dae-chul as Jun Chil-bok (42 years old), Super Son and Jin-sang's friend.
 Yoon Sun-woo as Yoo Heung-man, Lee Hwa-sang's ex-husband.
 Lee Hyun-woong as Chonam's CEO.
 Lee Myung-ho as Yang-shim's lover.
 Kim Kiri as Kye Sang-ki, Young-pil's past lover.
 Lee Ga-ryeong as Mi-ryeon's production company actress.
 Kim Kwang-young as a widower.
 Lee Hyo-bi as the widower's daughter.
 Ha Min as Su Sam University Hospital's director.
 Cheon Lee-seul as Han Shim-lan.
 Park Ha-joon as Young Ha-nam (12 years old).
 Kim Hyo-gyeong as Jin Se-mi, Ji-shin and Su-jin's daughter.

Special appearances
 Ha Jae-young as Lee Ju-gil (Poong-sang, Jin-sang, Jeong-sang, Hwa-sang and Wi-sang's father)
 Ahn Nae-sang 
 Moon Hee-kyung
 Oh Hyun-kyung
 Hwang Dong-joo
 Heo Sung-tae (ep. #1)
 Byeon Jeong-min as Bae Soo-jin (Ji-ham's wife)

Production
The first script reading took place on October 31, 2018 at KBS Annex Broadcasting Station in Yeouido, South Korea.

The series is the third collaboration between screenwriter Moon Young-nam and director Jin Hyung-wook after Three Brothers (2009-2010) and Wang's Family (2013-2014).

Original soundtrack

Part 1

Part 2

Part 3

Part 4

Part 5

Part 6

Part 7

Part 8

Viewership

Awards and nominations

Remake
 Vietnam: it is titled Cây táo nở hoa and currently airs on channel HTV2 (2021).

Notes

References

External links
  
 Liver or Die at Chorokbaem Media 
 Liver or Die at Pan Entertainment 
 
 
 

Korean Broadcasting System television dramas
2019 South Korean television series debuts
2019 South Korean television series endings
Korean-language television shows
Television series by Chorokbaem Media
Television series by Pan Entertainment